Prof Georg Ossian Sars HFRSE (20 April 1837 – 9 April 1927) was a Norwegian marine and freshwater biologist.

Life

Georg Ossian Sars was born on 20 April 1837 in Kinn, Norway (now part of Flora), the son of Pastor Michael Sars and Maren Sars; the historian Ernst Sars was his elder brother, and the singer Eva Nansen was his younger sister. He grew up in Manger, Hordaland, where his father was the local priest. He studied from 1852 to 1854 at Bergen Cathedral School, from 1854 at Christiania Cathedral School, and joined the university at Christiana (now the University of Oslo) in 1857. He indulged his interest in natural history while studying medicine; having collected water fleas in local lakes with Wilhelm Lilljeborg's works, he discovered new species, and this resulted in his first scientific publication. Georg Ossian Sars had a good memory and excellent drawing skills, and illustrated some of his father's zoological works.

Sars was a founding investigator of ichthyoplankton. In 1864, he was commissioned by the Norwegian government to investigate fisheries around the Norwegian coast. One of his first discoveries was that the eggs of cod are pelagic, that is, they inhabit the open water column. He continued to receive the patronage of the government throughout his career. Sars' primary research focus was on crustaceans and their systematics. He described many new species in his career, including in his magnum opus, An Account of the Crustacea of Norway.

For his achievements, Sars was made a Knight of the Order of St. Olav in 1892, and elevated to Knight-Commander in 1911. He was further awarded the Linnean Medal in 1910.

Georg Ossian Sars never married, and died on 9 April 1927 in Oslo. He is remembered in the scientific names of a number of marine invertebrates, as well as the journal Sarsia, the Sars International Centre for Marine Molecular Biology and the flagship of the Norwegian research fleet, the RV G.O.Sars.

Publications

 An Account of the Crustacea of Norway.
 Sars G. O. (1878). Bidrag til kundskaben om norges arktiske fauna. I. Mollusca regonis arcticae Norwegiae. Oversigt over de i norges arktiske region forekommende bløddyr. Christiania, Brøgger. [University of Oslo].

References

External links

 The RV G.O. Sars 
 Sars International Centre for Marine Molecular Biology
 G.O. Sars Open Library
 BHL Online works by G. O. Sars

1837 births
1927 deaths
19th-century Norwegian zoologists
20th-century Norwegian zoologists
Fisheries scientists
Honorary Fellows of the Royal Society of Edinburgh
Marine zoologists
Norwegian carcinologists
Norwegian marine biologists
People educated at Oslo Cathedral School
People educated at the Bergen Cathedral School
University of Oslo alumni
Academic staff of the University of Oslo
Members of the Royal Society of Sciences in Uppsala